A list of chapters of the Phi Kappa Theta fraternity categorized by state and province. This list includes both active and inactive chapters. Active chapters and colonies are noted in bold, inactive chapters in italics.

As of 2020, there are 36 active chapters and 1 colony, all located within the continental United States.

References

External links
 Phi Kappa Theta – National Website

chapters
Lists of chapters of United States student societies by society